The Tolidah or Tulida (meaning "Genealogy") is the oldest Samaritan historical work. Written mainly in Hebrew, with sections in hybrid Samaritan Hebrew and Aramaic, the book provides a concise summary of Samaritan history and the dynasty of kohanim up to the Middle Ages.

The Tolidah reached its final form in a manuscript copied by Jacob ben Harun in 1859 AD (1276 AH) with a parallel Arabic translation. Its full title is Ha-Tolidah ׳asher mit׳akeh beyn ha-Shemarim, which translates to "The Book of Genealogies that has been Transcribed by the Samaritans". Owing to its first publisher, it is sometimes known as the Chronicle Neubauer.

Manuscript and publication history
The history of the Tolidah itself is based primarily on information in the manuscript of 1859. It is partially corroborated by the composite nature of the text, which suggests that parts were written at different times. The oldest section of the Tolidah was originally compiled in 1149 AD (554 AH) by Eleazar ben ׳Amram of Nablus. This chronicle was continued by Jacob ben Ishmael in 1346 AD (747 AH). Other scribes continued the work down to 1859.

The Tolidah was brought to the attention of western scholarship by Adolf Neubauer, who purchased the manuscript of Jacob ben Harun, now MS or. 651 in the Bodleian Library, and published it in 1869. His edition was based on MS or. 651 and on a manuscript copied in 1797 AD (1212 AH) by Shlomo ben Ṭobiah, which he could not buy but was able to view for a few hours in Nablus.

In 1870, Moritz Heidenheim, apparently unaware of Neubauer's publication of the year before, published his own edition of the Tolidah. In 1954, John Bowman, claiming to have seen a manuscript with "the appearance of antiquity" that he believed to be the original Tolidah, published a new edition. He did not give a date or name the scribe of the manuscript. In 1977, he published an English translation of the "original" part of the chronicle. The latest critical edition, based on the more manuscripts than all previous and including an English translation and commentary, is that of Moshe Florentin, published in 1999.

Contents
The first part of the Tolidah, written in Aramaic, is a discussion of the meridian that passes through Mount Gerizim.

The genealogies of the patriarchs from Adam to Moses are given, and that of Aaron down to Uzzi. It lists the High Priests of Israel (that is, mainly the Samaritan High Priests) from the destruction of the tabernacle at Shiloh down to the time of the original author, Eleazar ben ׳Amram.

The most prominent Samaritan families are listed. Brief references to wider world exist solely to place these families in their context. Although the chronicle was compiled in the Crusader kingdom of Jerusalem, it does not mention the Crusaders. It does mentioned the Seljuk conquest of Ramla in 1070/71 AD (463 AH), and provides evidence for Samaritan communities in Gaza and Acre in the 12th century AD.

The continuation of 1346 provides a list of jubilees from the Israelite conquest of Canaan down to the compiler's own time. The continuation mentions the devastation wrought on the Samaritan community at Nablus by a major raid in the mid-13th century AD. This was not the Templar raid of 1242, which devastated the Muslim inhabitants. Neubauer believed it to be the Khwarazmian raid that conquered Jerusalem in 1244, but it was more likely the Mongol raid of 1260.

Editions

See also
 Samaritan Chronicle
 Chronicles of Jerahmeel
 The Asatir

References

External links
View document facsimile at the British Library website
Samaritan texts
Samaritan culture and history